The 54th Filmfare Awards South ceremony honouring the winners and nominees of the best of South Indian cinema in 2006 is an event that was at the Hyderabad International Convention Centre Hitex, Hyderabad on 4 August 2007.

Main awards
Winners are listed first, highlighted in boldface.

Kannada cinema

Malayalam cinema

Tamil cinema

Telugu cinema

Technical Awards

Special awards

References

General
 54th Filmfare Awards South Winners

External links
 
 

Filmfare Awards South
2007 Indian film awards